Moquette, derived from the French word for carpet, is a type of woven pile fabric in which cut or uncut threads form a short dense cut or loop pile. As well as giving it a distinctive velvet-like feel, the pile construction is particularly durable, and ideally suited to applications such as public transport. Its upright fibres form a flexible, non-rigid surface, which are constantly displaced to give durability and anti-stain benefits. Traditional moquette fabrics are made from a wool nylon face with an interwoven cotton backing.

Origin
Moquette originated in France, where it was woven by hand. The standard width was a Flemish ell of 27 inches. There were two finishes: moquette velouté, which had a cut pile like English Wilton, and moquette bouclé, which had an uncut pile like Brussels carpet. It is still woven in Yorkshire using traditional techniques.

Examples
As of 1946, a moquette carpet was on display in the banquet room of Mount Vernon, allegedly a gift from Louis XVI to George Washington. It depicted the American coat of arms in the center and had a green background with gold stars on it. As of February 2023, it was listed as not on display at Mount Vernon under the ownership of the Mount Vernon Ladies' Association.

Moquette is occasionally used in clothing. In 1932–33, the United States Army Air Corps contracted for cold-weather leather flight suits lined with moquette, apparently as an economy substitute for sheepskin.

In public transportation

Moquette is used as public transit seat coverings in many countries, particularly the seats of London Underground's Tube trains, due to its durability. Such seat covers may be designed with intricate patterns as to make the transit service more memorable and less likely to be vandalized, as well as consist of bright colors to conceal wear, while avoiding such bright and intense patterns such that it "dazzles" passengers and makes them feel unwell. They may also contain patterns that reflect local culture and history, such as the "Barman", or "Landmark", moquette pattern designed in 2010 for London public transportation seat coverings that depicts landmarks in London.

They are also relatively cheap to produce, and began to be used in London in the 1920s. During the decades of the many railway companies, there were some ten moquette manufacturers in the UK. As a result of the nationalisation of the railways after World War II, and then the Beeching cuts of the early 1960s, the number of customers plummeted. By the mid-1960s, there were two suppliers, one of which was Courtaulds. The other is Holdsworth Fabrics, based in Halifax, West Yorkshire.

See also
Mockado
Carpet
Fabric
Upholstery
Weaving

References

External links
 Gallery of moquettes used by London transport

Woven fabrics